Patrícia Poeta Pfingstag (born 19 October 1976 in São Jerônimo) is a Brazilian newscaster and journalist.

Personal life
She is a Catholic Christian, is married to Amauri Soares, and has one child in this union.

Notes

1976 births
Living people
People from Rio Grande do Sul
Brazilian journalists
Brazilian women journalists
Brazilian Jews
Brazilian television presenters
Brazilian women television presenters